Nikolai Vambersky (born 8 March 1997) is an Austrian football player of Russian descent.

Club career
He made his Austrian Football First League debut for Floridsdorfer AC on 11 August 2017 in a game against SC Wiener Neustadt.

References

External links
 

1997 births
Austrian people of Russian descent
Living people
Austrian footballers
1. Simmeringer SC players
Floridsdorfer AC players
2. Liga (Austria) players
Association football goalkeepers